Fort William was a provincial electoral district in the Canadian province of Ontario, active from 1908 to 1999. The district was created out of the former Fort William and Lake of the Woods district for the 1908 election, serving the city of Fort William and the surrounding area.

When the city of Fort William merged with the neighbouring city of Port Arthur in 1970 to create the current city of Thunder Bay, the district of Fort William and the corresponding electoral district of Port Arthur continued as separate districts serving the new city.

For the 1999 provincial election, the government of Mike Harris redistributed provincial electoral districts to correspond to the same boundaries and names that were in use for the province's federal electoral districts. Fort William was merged at that time into the new district of Thunder Bay—Atikokan.

Members of Provincial Parliament

Election results

References

Former provincial electoral districts of Ontario
Politics of Thunder Bay